Magazines in Spain are varied and numerous, but they have small circulation. In terms of frequency, the Spanish magazines are mostly weekly and monthly. Although there are news magazines and political magazines in the country, they mostly focuses on entertainment, social events, sports, and television. 

There were many influential feminist magazines in the eighteenth and nineteenth centuries in the country. The first magazine of which the editor-in-chief was a woman was El Robespierre Español existed in the period 1811–1812. The number of the mainstream women's magazines intensified in the 1960s. As of 2014 there were also large number of aviation magazines in the country.

The data by the General Media Survey found that in 2003 there were 137 magazines in Spain. At the beginning of 2005 the number rose to 576. In addition, there was a total of 19 supplements. However, between 2008 and 2012 a total of 182 magazines ceased publication in Spain.

The following is an incomplete list of current and defunct magazines published in Spain. They may be published in Spanish or in other languages.

0-9
 391

A

 Academia
 Actualidad Económica
 Alternativas Económicas
 La Ametralladora
 Andaina
 The Andalucian
 Apartamento
 Arquitecturas Bis
 Automovil
 Autopista

B

 Barcelona Cómica
 Barcelona Metròpolis
 Barrabás
 BCN Week
 El Be Negre
 Bética
 Blanco y Negro
 Buen Humor
 Butifarra

C

 Cairo
 La Calle
 Cambio 16
 La Campana de Gràcia
 El Cascabel
 Cavall Fort
 Cervantes
 El Ciervo
 Cinemanía
 La Codorniz
 Confidentiel
 La Conquista del Estado
 CORREDOR\
 El Croquis
 Cuadernos para el Diálogo
 Cuore

D

 La Directa
 Desnivel
 Diez Minutos
 Doblón
 Don Balón

E

 El Ecologista
 Emprendedores
 En Patufet
 Época
 Erreakzioareaccion
 La España moderna
 L'Esquella de la Torratxa
 Estudis Romànics
 European Vibe Magazine

F
 Film Ideal
 Forbes Spain
 Fotogramas

G
 La Gaceta Literaria
 Garbo
 Goldberg Magazine
 Gutiérrez

H

 Hairstyles
 Hala Madrid
 Hermano Lobo
 Historia National Geographic
 Hobby Consolas
 ¡Hola!
Hora de España

I

 La Ilustración Española y Americana
 Iniciales
 Ínsula
 Interviu
 Intramuros
 Inversión de Finanzas

J

 Jakin
 Jaque
 Jot Down
 El Jueves

K
 Kiss Comix
 Kovalski Fly

L

 Labores del Hogar
 La Lectura
 Lecturas
 Libertad
 La Luz del Porvenir
 Luz y unión

M

 Los Madriles
 Mata Ratos 
 Medina
 Meridià
 Mi Casa
 Micromanía
 Mister K
 Mondo Sonoro
 Mongolia
 El Mono Azul
 Mortadelo
 Mundo Hispánico
 El Museo Universal
 Música Nueva
 Muy Interesante

N

 Lo Noy de la mare
 Nuestro Cine
 Nuestro Cinema 
 Nuestro Tiempo
 Nueva Cultura
 Nueva Revista
 Nuevo Estilo
 Números Rojos

O
 Objetivo
 Octubre

P

 El Papus
 Pèl & Ploma
 Pensat i Fet
 Politica Exterior
 Popular 1 Magazine
 Por Favor
 Primer Acto
 Primer Plano
 Prometeo
 Pronto
 El Propagador de la libertad
 Pulgarcito

Q
 Quo

R

 La Revista Blanca
 Revista Contemporánea 
 Revista Geográfica Española
 Revista de Girona
 Revista de Libros
 Revista de Occidente
 Rockdelux
 Ronda Iberia

S
 Semana
 Signos Magazine
 SP
 Stendek

T

 Tapas
 Tele Indiscreta
 Telva
 Teresa
 El Temps
 Tiempo
 La Traca
 El Triangle
 Tribuna
 Trinca (comic)
 Triumph
 Triunfo

U
 Unión Libre

V

 Vértice
 El Vibora
 Vindicación Feminista
 La Violeta
 La Violeta de oro
V.O.
 Virolet
 Vivir en el Campo
 Vogue Spain

Z
 Zero

See also
 Media of Spain
 List of newspapers in Spain

References

Spain

Lists of mass media in Spain